Maria Rubert (born 18 October 1980) is an international lawyer based in Dubai, United Arab Emirates.

Early life and education
Rubert was born in Valencia, Spain and moved to the United States as a student athlete where she obtained a B.S. Political Science at Kennesaw State University, Georgia, USA. She was part of the roster who won the first KSU women’s soccer NCAA II National Championship. Rubert obtained a Bachelor of Laws from Alfonso X El Sabio University in Madrid. She received an LL.M. from Washington College of Law of American University in Washington DC, and expects to complete an EMBA with IE Business School in December 2015.

Career
Prior to reaching Dubai she held several positions in international fields: government entities (Embassy of Mexico in Washington DC), key institutions (ICC International Court of Arbitration in Paris and the Centre on International Commercial Arbitration in Washington DC); along with corporations (Banco Santander in Madrid) and private practice. In parallel to her legal counsel role, she is registered as an arbitrator in most arbitration centers in the United Arab Emirates; and is a board member of the Spanish Business Council in the UAE, a non-profit organization fomenting the UAE-Spanish business relations and supporting the Spanish community in Dubai. She has a mentorship program with different Universities in Europe and US to enhance the training of junior lawyers.

References

External links
 Emiratos, refugio árabe para emigrantes españoles

Living people
21st-century Spanish lawyers
1980 births
Spanish women lawyers
People from Valencia
Spanish expatriates in the United Arab Emirates
Spanish expatriates in the United States
Kennesaw State University alumni
Alfonso X El Sabio University alumni